Elizabeth of Great Britain may refer to:
 Princess Elizabeth of Great Britain (1741–1759), grandchild of King George II and sister of King George III
 Elizabeth II (1926–2022), Queen of the United Kingdom

See also
 Princess Elizabeth (disambiguation)
 Queen Elizabeth (disambiguation)